Morning Star is the ninth studio album released by Spear of Destiny.

Track listing 
All tracks composed by Kirk Brandon
"Lucky Man" - 4:42
"Mayday" - 4:11
"Half Life" - 4:18
"This Wonderful Life" - 4:31
"Better Man" - 3:11
"White Rose" - 4:31
"She" - 5:40
"Belongings" - 4:41
"Mermaid" - 4:05
"Warleigh Road" - 6:39
"Crowley" - 2:57

Personnel 
Spear of Destiny
Kirk Brandon - vocals, guitar 
Warren Wilson - guitar 
James Yardley - bass 
Danny Farrant - drums
John Lennard - saxophone
with:
Claire Colley - voice on "She"

References

Spear of Destiny (band) albums
2003 albums